The Sierra de Lema flycatcher or Tepui flycatcher (Mionectes roraimae) is a species of bird in the tyrant flycatcher family Tyrannidae. It is found in highland areas, including the table-top mountains (tepui), of southern Venezuela and the neighbouring parts of Brazil and Guiana. Its natural habitats are moist montane forests.

The Sierra de Lema flycatcher was described by the English ornithologist Charles Chubb in 1919 as a subspecies of the ochre-bellied flycatcher. He coined the trinomial name Pipromorpha oleaginea roraimae and specified the type location as Mount Roraima in the southeastern corner of Venezuela. The specific epithet roraimae is a Latinized form of Mount Roraima. It was treated as a subspecies of McConnell's flycatcher (Mionectes macconnelli) by the American ornithologist Clyde Todd in 1921. It was split from the McConnell's flycatcher based on a study published in 2014 that showed that the two taxa differed in habitat choice, vocalization and display behaviour.

References

External links
Xeno-canto: audio recordings of the Tepui flycatcher

Mionectes
Birds of the Guianas
Birds of Venezuela
Birds described in 1919
Birds of the Tepuis